George C. Boldt Yacht House is an historic yacht house located on the northeast shore of Wellesley Island near Alexandria Bay in Jefferson County, New York. It was commissioned by George Boldt to house the many watercraft he owned and is adjacent to Boldt Castle.

The yacht house was designed by the Philadelphia architects G. W. & W. D. Hewitt and built in 1903. It is a massive, eclectic, Shingle-style structure composed of five elements, which are: 
a circular tower containing reception rooms,
a central group of three yacht bays,
a large east yacht bay,
a combination office and storage wing with a crenelated tower, and
a large caretaker's residence.

The yacht house was listed on the National Register of Historic Places in 1978. On display in the yacht house is the steam yacht Kestrel, as well as various other vintage boats, a number of which are on loan from the Antique Boat Museum in Clayton, New York.

References

External links 
 

Sports venues on the National Register of Historic Places in New York (state)
Queen Anne architecture in New York (state)
Houses completed in 1903
Shingle Style architecture in New York (state)
Sports venues in Jefferson County, New York
National Register of Historic Places in Jefferson County, New York
1903 establishments in New York (state)